Hortencia Enríquez Ortega (born 1 April 1953) is a Mexican politician from the Institutional Revolutionary Party. From 2000 to 2003 she served as Deputy of the LVIII Legislature of the Mexican Congress representing Chihuahua, previously serving in the Congress of Chihuahua from 1994 to 1997.

References

1953 births
Living people
Politicians from Chihuahua (state)
Women members of the Chamber of Deputies (Mexico)
Institutional Revolutionary Party politicians
20th-century Mexican politicians
20th-century Mexican women politicians
21st-century Mexican politicians
21st-century Mexican women politicians
Deputies of the LVIII Legislature of Mexico
Members of the Chamber of Deputies (Mexico) for Chihuahua (state)
Members of the Congress of Chihuahua